Nymphaea ondinea is a flowering aquatic plant in the family Nymphaeaceae native to northwestern Australia. Originally classified in its own genus as Ondinea purpurea, molecular studies have shown that it is morphologically aberrant species of Nymphaea, to which it has been transferred. It grows from a corm-like rhizome and is found in ephemeral pools and rivers that are dry for a significant portion of the year. The rhizome survives the dry season in drying mud.

The species lacks an aril, appendages on the carpel, a corolla, and certain other characteristics that sets it apart from other Nymphaea.

It is a small plant that grows, among other places, in shallow creeks of the Kimberley region of Western Australia. It grows from a rhizome that is about 2.5 cm long, and has leaves that are approximately 25 cm long, mostly submerged but with the occasional small floating leaf.

References

ondinea
Angiosperms of Western Australia